The Journal of the Royal Asiatic Society is an academic journal which publishes articles on the history, archaeology, literature, language, religion and art of South Asia, the Middle East (together with North Africa and Ethiopia), Central Asia, East Asia and South-East Asia. It has been published by the Royal Asiatic Society of Great Britain and Ireland since 1834.

Publications

External links 

 
 Journal of the Royal Asiatic Society at the Royal Asiatic Society of Great Britain and Ireland
 Royal Asiatic Society of Great Britain and Ireland at JSTOR
  (vol. 8).
  (1897).
  (1903).

Multidisciplinary humanities journals
Cambridge University Press academic journals
Publications established in 1824
English-language journals
Academic journals associated with learned and professional societies of the United Kingdom